Complex is the second studio album by Australian art pop singer-songwriter Montaigne. It was released on 30 August 2019.

Prior to release, Montaigne said the tracks on the album "all came together over a couple of years and each song pertains to a different period of my life." She said "It's basically a series of portraits of all of my insecurities, or the weird relationships I've been in, or neurotic feelings I've felt while being attracted to others. The album's like this veil behind which I stashed all these secrets I was keeping from myself."

The album was supported by a 13-date national tour in November 2019.

Reception
Jeff Jenkins from Stack Magazine called it "one of the year's finest records." saying "She packs more thrills into that opening track, 'Change' than most pop artists deliver in their career." adding "Montaigne is a storyteller for our times – fearless, feisty, combative and yes, complex."

Track listing

Personnel
Montaigne – vocals
Wynne Bennett – production on "Love Might Be Found (Volcano)"
Tony Buchen – mixing on "Losing My Mind", "Love Might Be Found (Volcano)", and "Stockholm Syndrome"; production on "Losing My Mind"; production, recording, and mixing on "Change", "The Dying Song", "Please You", "Is This All I Am Good For?", and "I Am a Clown"
Dr R. – production on "Ready"
Eric J. Dubowsky – production on "Ready", mixing on "Pleasure" and "Ready"
Thomas Rawle – production on "Losing My Mind" and "Pleasure"
Jarrad Rogers – production and mixing on "Complex"
David Andrew Sitek – production on "Stockholm Syndrome"
Mario Spate – production and mixing on "Showyourself"
Leon Zervos – mastering

Charts

Release history

References

2019 albums
Montaigne (musician) albums
Wonderlick Entertainment albums
Sony Music Australia albums
Albums produced by Dave Sitek